Afiyah Cornwall (born 10 April 2002) is a Trinidad and Tobago footballer who plays as a forward for QPCC and the Trinidad and Tobago women's national team.

International career
Cornwall represented Trinidad and Tobago at the 2016 CONCACAF Girls' U-15 Championship and the 2020 CONCACAF Women's U-20 Championship. At senior level, she played the 2020 CONCACAF Women's Olympic Qualifying Championship qualification.

International goals
Scores and results list Trinidad and Tobago goal tally first.

References

External links

2002 births
Living people
Women's association football forwards
Trinidad and Tobago women's footballers
Trinidad and Tobago women's international footballers
Competitors at the 2018 Central American and Caribbean Games
Trinidad and Tobago women's futsal players
Futsal players at the 2018 Summer Youth Olympics